Argyrostagma is a genus of moths in the subfamily Lymantriinae. The genus was erected by Per Olof Christopher Aurivillius in 1904.

Species
Argyrostagma niobe (Weymer, 1896) Tanzania
Argyrostagma thomsoni (H. Druce, 1898) western Africa

References

Lymantriinae
Noctuoidea genera